HMS Pembroke is a  of the Royal Navy. She was the second ship launched of the second batch of the class, which had several improvements over the first five ships built. The ship was posted for three years to the Persian Gulf between 2009 and 2012. Pembroke has since been deployed in international exercises and in historic ordnance detection in home waters. Pembroke was the first of the Royal Navy’s Mine Countermeasures Vessels to be fitted with the Oceanographic Reconnaissance Combat Architecture combat system to replace the previous NAUTIS combat system in early 2020.

Design and description
The Sandown-class minehunter was designed to complement the existing , by providing a cheaper alternative and specific mine hunting service. The Sandown-class vessels were delivered in two batches, with the first five ships delivered by Vosper Thornycroft to the Royal Navy by November 1994. The company was then awarded the contract for a second batch of seven vessels, of which Pembroke was the second.

Ships of the Sandown-class had a hull constructed from  glass reinforced plastic, and equipment on-board have a low magnetic signature. While under normal circumstances, the ship operates on diesel engines, when operating near mines she uses an electric drive system. In addition to the bow thrusters, she is also equipped with a  Voith Schneider cyclorotor. Further anti-mine equipment includes the Seafox mine disposal system. Ships of the class were each equipped with a single 30mm DS30M Mk2 gun.

Construction

Pembroke was constructed at the Vosper Thornycroft in Southampton, England. She was used for shock trials on the improvements made to the second batch of Sandown-class minehunters.

Operational history
Pembroke was posted to Persian Gulf duties in 2009, and spent the following three years conducting operations and exercises there. In 2012, she returned to HMNB Clyde. On the way, she and  provided assistance to Delhi Express, a cargo vessel which had lost power while transiting the Gulf of Aden. Pembroke and Middleton protected the ship until it was under way once more, as the area is known for piracy. During the mission to the gulf, the ship had been manned by seven different crews. Upon returning to Faslane, she was placed in dry dock for two months for maintenance.

Pembroke underwent a six-month period of support work and upgrades by Babcock International. The upgrades included the installation of the Defence Information Infrastructure, which allows for information sharing across the entire defence network. Further work was taken to upgrade the high pressure air system as well as installing an expanded fire detection system. The work was completed by early 2014, when the ship underwent further sea trials.

After a  mine was dredged up by a fishing boat in 2014, Pembroke detonated the mine using a Seafox anti-mine drone. In 2015, she spent four months cooperating in operations with ships from the German, Polish, Belgian and Royal Dutch navies. During this time she located nine Second World War bombs, including a  bomb in the North Sea. In preparation for a deployment to the Baltic Sea in April 2016, earlier that year, Pembroke took part in a series of training exercises including simulated attack by aircraft, gunnery, salvage and mine hunting.

References

External links

Sandown-class minehunters
Ships built in Southampton
1997 ships
Minehunters of the United Kingdom